Chlorophyllide-a oxygenase, chlorophyllide a oxygenase, chlorophyll-b synthase, CAO) is an enzyme with systematic name chlorophyllide-a:oxygen 7-oxidoreductase. This enzyme catalyses the following chemical reactions

 (1) chlorophyllide a + O2 + NADPH + H+  7-hydroxychlorophyllide a + H2O + NADP+
 (2) 7-hydroxychlorophyllide a + O2 + NADPH + H+  chlorophyllide b + 2 H2O + NADP+

This enzyme contains a mononuclear iron centre and is part of the biosynthetic pathway to chlorophylls.

See also
 Biosynthesis of chlorophylls

References

External links 
 

EC 1.14.13